Muhammad Yusuf Ali (1923 – December 1998) was a Bangladesh politician. He was the first minister for Education and Cultural Affairs in the first cabinet of Bangladesh.

Early life and education
Ali was born in Farakkabad, Biral, Dinajpur in 1923. He matriculated in 1944 from Dinajpur Academy High School and intermediate exams from Ripon College. He got a Bachelor of Arts degree from Surendranath College and a Master of Arts degree from the University of Dhaka in 1953. He later earned a B.Law degree from University of Rajshahi and joined the Dinajpur district bar.

Career
Ali was a professor of Nawabganj College and afterwards at Surendranath College. He joined awami league in 1960 and in 1962 was elected to the East Pakistan Legislative Assembly. In 1965 he was elected to the Pakistan Constituent Assembly. He was involved in a number of Bengali Nationalist movements including Six point movement, Agartala Conspiracy Case and 1969 uprising in East Pakistan. He was elected to the national assembly of Pakistan.

Ali moved to India during Bangladesh Liberation war. On 17 April 1971 he read declaration of independence of Bangladesh at the oath taking ceremony of Mujibnagar Government. In the Mujibnagar Government he was the chairman of Youth Control Board. It recruited and trained personal for the Mukti Bahini. He was the first minister for Education and Cultural Affairs of Bangladesh, Sheikh Mujibur Rahman cabinet. Ali was the speaker of Ganaporishad (provisional Parliament of Bangladesh) and he made oath of the acting president with ministers of provisional government. He was made the Chairman of Shromik League of BAKSAL (Bangladesh Krishok Shromik Awami League) by Sheikh Mujibur Rahman, then president of Bangladesh. Ali was one of the founding members of the Bangladesh Football Federation, on 15 July 1972. In 1975 he was the Labour Minister in the BAKSAL. In 1975, after the Assassination of Sheikh Mujibur Rahman he joined the Khandakar Mushtaq Ahmed government. He became Minister of Planning of the Khondaker Mostaq Ahmad government.

In 1977, Ali was the secretary-general Mizanur Rahman Chowdhury fraction of Bangladesh Awami League. He joined the Bangladesh Nationalist Party after a failed parliamentary election. In 1979 he was Minister of Textile in Ziaur Rahman cabinet. In 1981 he was the Minister of Jute and Textile in Justice Abdus Sattar cabinet. He joined Jatiya Party in 1985. In 1986 he served as relief and rehabilitation minister under President Ershad.

Ali died in December 1998.

References

1923 births
1998 deaths
People from Dinajpur District, Bangladesh
University of Dhaka alumni
University of Rajshahi alumni
Awami League politicians
Date of birth missing
Date of death missing
Place of death missing
Education ministers of Bangladesh
Cultural Affairs ministers of Bangladesh
Labour ministers of Bangladesh
Planning ministers of Bangladesh
Textile ministers of Bangladesh
Textiles and Jute ministers of Bangladesh
Bangladesh Krishak Sramik Awami League executive committee members
Bangladesh Krishak Sramik Awami League central committee members